Sasamón is a municipality and town located in the province of Burgos, Castile and León, Spain. According to the 2004 census (INE), the municipality has a population of 1,346 inhabitants.

During pre-Roman times, it was the capital of the Turmodigi tribe, under the name Segisama. During the reign of first Roman emperor Augustus, the town was the headquarters of the Roman legions that fought during the Cantabrian wars.

Demography

The evolution of its population has been negative over the last twenty years.

1987: 1.790 inhabitants
1991: 1.786 inhabitants
1995: 1.514 inhabitants
1999: 1.543 inhabitants
2003: 1.464 inhabitants
2005: 1.315 inhabitants
2006: 1.296 inhabitants

Civil Architecture 

Roman Bridges

There are two Roman bridges over the Brullés river.

References 

Municipalities in the Province of Burgos